MGD may stand for:
 Maharani Gayatri Devi Girls’ Public School, Jaipur, India
 Miller Genuine Draft beer, Miller Brewing Company
 Guildford railway station, Perth, Australia, station code
 Mean glandular dose, of radiation to the breast 
 Meibomian gland dysfunction, an eye disease
 Minggang East railway station, China Railway pinyin code MGD